Ramoth was a Levite city in the Tribe of Issachar. It is probably the same as Remeth and Jarmuth. (Joshua 19:17,21  1 Chronicles 6:71-73) Some have tentatively identified it with Kokab el-Hawa north of Beth-Shean.

Hebrew Bible cities
Former populated places in Israel
Levites